Marek Woziński (born 19 March 1956) is a Polish association football manager.

References

1956 births
Living people
Polish football managers
Widzew Łódź managers
Świt Nowy Dwór Mazowiecki managers
ŁKS Łódź managers
I liga managers